Paul Wright may refer to:

Sports
Paul Wright (footballer) (born 1967), Scottish footballer
Paul Wright (soccer) (born 1969), English/American soccer player
Paul Wright (cyclist) (born 1973), English professional racing cyclist
Big Show, American professional wrestler

Musicians
Paul Leddington Wright, organist of Coventry Cathedral and choral conductor
Paul Wright, guitarist for the English goth rock band Fields of the Nephilim
Paul Wright (singer) (born 1979), American Christian singer and musician

Others
Paul Wright (diplomat) (1915–2005), British diplomat, ambassador to Congo and to Lebanon
Paul Wright (Sub-Dean of the Chapel Royal) (born 1966), English military and royal chaplain
Paul Wright (Archdeacon of Bromley & Bexley) (born 1954)
Paul K. Wright (born 1947), English/American mechanical engineer
Paul J. Wright (born 1955), California attorney and English barrister
Paul M. Wright (born 1968), author of first book on Database forensics
Paul S. Wright (born 1946), British professor
Paul Elbridge Wright (1931–2017), American mechanical engineer, business executive
Paul Wright (born 1978), founder of the British Culture Archive